This is a complete list of cricketers who represented the Players in first-class matches from 1806 to 1962. The majority of matches were the annual Gentlemen v Players fixtures but Players teams also competed against international touring teams on occasion and the cricketers who represented the Players in those matches are included in the list. The cricketers are listed alphabetically but some of the names are still redlinks. The dates are the span of years in which the cricketer made appearances in Players teams.

For cricketers who appeared for the Players only prior to 1841, see List of Players cricketers (1806–1840).

A

B

C

D

E
 David Eastwood (1877)
 John Edrich (1959–1962)
 Bill Edrich (1938)
 Frank Edwards (1925)
 Charles Ellis (1863)
 George Emmett (1953)
 Tom Emmett (1869–1885)
 Godfrey Evans (1946–1959)

F

G

H

I
 Roger Iddison (1862–1864)
 Jack Iddon (1931)
 Jack Ikin (1946–1951)
 Ray Illingworth (1955–1959)
 James Iremonger (1902–1911)

J
 Les Jackson (1949–1960)
 John Jackson (1857–1864)
 Thomas Jayes (1906–1910)
 Percy Jeeves (1914)
 Roly Jenkins (1949)
 Harry Jupp (1863–1882)

K

L

M

N
 Jack Newman (1922–1928)
 John Newstead (1908–1909)
 Maurice Nichol (1931)
 Stan Nichols (1930–1938)
 Thomas Nixon (1851–1853)

O
 Alan Oakman (1956)
 Thomas Oates (1907)
 Jack O'Connor (1934)
 William Oscroft (1871–1880)

P

Q
 Walter Quaife (1889–1895)
 Willie Quaife (1897–1913)

R

S

T

U
 George Ulyett (1875–1892)

V
 Hedley Verity (1931–1936)
 Joe Vine (1901–1903)
 Bill Voce (1932)

W

Y
 Tom Young (1925–1928)
 Sailor Young (1899–1900)

References

See also
 List of Gentlemen v Players matches
 List of Players cricketers (1806–1840)
 List of Gentlemen cricketers (1806–1840)
 List of Gentlemen cricketers (1841–1962)

1841
Players 1841
1841